Gamma Reticuli (Gamma Ret, γ Reticuli, γ Ret) is a solitary star in the southern constellation of Reticulum. With an apparent visual magnitude of 4.5,  it can be faintly seen with the naked eye. Based upon an annual parallax shift of 6.95 mas, it is located roughly 469 light years from the Sun. At that distance, the visual magnitude is diminished by an extinction factor of 0.08 due to interstellar dust.

This is an evolved red giant star, currently on the asymptotic giant branch, with a stellar classification of M4 III. It is a semiregular variable with a period of 25 days. Gamma Reticuli has 1.5−2 times the mass of the Sun, 115 times the Sun's radius, and radiates 1,846 times the solar luminosity from its outer atmosphere at an effective temperature of 3,450 K.

Gamma Reticuli is moving through the Galaxy at a speed of 24.8 km/s relative to the Sun. Its projected Galactic orbit carries it between 24,100 and 39,200 light years from the center of the Galaxy.

References

M-type giants
Asymptotic-giant-branch stars
Reticulum (constellation)
Reticuli, Gamma
Durchmusterung objects
025705
018744
1264